Lisburn Rangers Football Club is a Northern Irish, intermediate-level association football club based in Lisburn and playing in the Premier Division of the Northern Amateur Football League.  The club has been a member of the Amateur League since 1963.

On Saturday 1 August 2009 they opened their new home at Lisburn Leisureplex with a match against Lisburn Distillery. The facilities were named "Stanley Park" after long serving clubman and Club President Stanley Coulter in a ceremony before the match.

Lisburn Rangers' reserve team are playing in Division 3B of the Northern Amateur Football League after being promoted as League Winners in 2010. After obtaining promotion in the 2015 the Reserve team now play in 3B.

Honours

Intermediate honours
Clarence Cup: 2
1964–65, 1972–73
Border Cup: 1
1972–73

External links  
 lisburnrangers.com
 nifootball.co.uk - (For fixtures, results and tables of all Northern Ireland amateur football leagues)

Notes

Association football clubs in Northern Ireland
Sport in Lisburn
Northern Amateur Football League clubs
Association football clubs in County Antrim
1957 establishments in Northern Ireland
Association football clubs established in 1957